The Princes in the Tower refers to the apparent murder in England in the 1480s of the deposed King Edward V of England and Richard of Shrewsbury, Duke of York. These two brothers were the only sons of King Edward IV and Elizabeth Woodville surviving at the time of their father's death in 1483. When they were 12 and 9 years old, respectively, they were lodged in the Tower of London by their paternal uncle and all-powerful regent the Duke of Gloucester. This was supposedly in preparation for Edward V's forthcoming coronation. However, before the young king could be crowned, he and his brother were declared illegitimate. Gloucester ascended the throne as Richard III.

It is unclear what happened to the boys after the last recorded sighting of them in the tower. It is generally assumed that they were murdered; a common hypothesis is that they were killed by Richard in an attempt to secure his hold on the throne. Their deaths may have occurred sometime in 1483, but apart from their disappearance, the only evidence is circumstantial. As a result, several other hypotheses about their fates have been proposed, including the suggestion that they were murdered by their maternal uncle the Duke of Buckingham or future brother-in-law King Henry VII, among others. It has also been suggested that one or both princes may have escaped assassination. In 1487, Lambert Simnel initially claimed to be the Duke of York, but later claimed to be York's cousin the Earl of Warwick. From 1491 until his capture in 1497, Perkin Warbeck claimed to be the Duke of York, having supposedly escaped to Flanders. Warbeck's claim was supported by some contemporaries, including York's aunt the Duchess of Burgundy.

In 1674, workmen at the tower dug up, from under the staircase, a wooden box containing two small human skeletons. The bones were widely accepted at the time as those of the princes, but this has not been proven and is far from certain. King Charles II had the bones buried in Westminster Abbey, where they remain.

Background
On 9 April 1483, Edward IV of England died unexpectedly after an illness lasting around three weeks. At the time, Edward's son, the new King Edward V, was at Ludlow Castle, and the dead king's brother, Richard, Duke of Gloucester, was at Middleham Castle in Yorkshire. The news reached Gloucester around 15 April, although he may have been forewarned of Edward's illness. It is reported that he then went to York Minster to publicly "pledge his loyalty to his new king". The Croyland Chronicle states that, before his death, Edward IV designated his brother Gloucester as Lord Protector. Edward's request may not have mattered, however, since "as the precedent of Henry V showed, the Privy Council was not bound to follow the wishes of a dead king".

Edward V and Gloucester set out for London from the west and north respectively, meeting at Stony Stratford on 29 April. The following morning, Gloucester arrested Edward's retinue including the boys' uncle, Anthony Woodville, 2nd Earl Rivers, and their half-brother Sir Richard Grey. They were sent to Pontefract Castle in Yorkshire where, on 25 June, they were beheaded. Gloucester then took possession of the prince himself, prompting Elizabeth Woodville to take her other son, Richard, Duke of York, and her daughters into sanctuary at Westminster Abbey.

Edward V and Gloucester arrived in London together. Plans continued for Edward's coronation, but the date was postponed from 4 May to 25 June. On 19 May 1483 Edward was lodged in the Tower of London, then the traditional residence of monarchs prior to coronation. On 16 June, he was joined by his younger brother Richard, Duke of York, who was previously in sanctuary. At this point the date of Edward's coronation was indefinitely postponed by their uncle, Gloucester. On Sunday 22 June, a sermon was preached by Dr. Ralph Shaa, brother of the Lord Mayor of London, at Saint Paul's Cross claiming Gloucester to be the only legitimate heir of the House of York. On 25 June, "a group of lords, knights and gentlemen" petitioned Richard to take the throne. Both princes were subsequently declared illegitimate by Parliament; this was confirmed in 1484 by an Act of Parliament known as Titulus Regius. The act stated that Edward IV and Elizabeth Woodville's marriage was invalid because of Edward's pre-contract of marriage with Lady Eleanor Butler. Gloucester was crowned King Richard III of England on 6 July. The declaration of the boys' illegitimacy has been described by Rosemary Horrox as an ex post facto justification for Richard's accession.

Disappearance
Dominic Mancini, an Italian friar who visited England in the 1480s and who was in London in the spring and summer of 1483, recorded that after Richard III seized the throne, Edward and his younger brother Richard were taken into the "inner apartments of the Tower" and then were seen less and less until they disappeared altogether. Mancini records that during this period Edward was regularly visited by a doctor, who reported that Edward, "like a victim prepared for sacrifice, sought remission of his sins by daily confession and penance, because he believed that death was facing him." The Latin reference to "Argentinus medicus", was originally translated as "a Strasbourg doctor"; however, D.E. Rhodes suggests it may actually refer to "Doctor Argentine", whom Rhodes identifies as John Argentine, an English physician who later served as provost of King's College, Cambridge, and as doctor to Arthur, Prince of Wales, eldest son of King Henry VII of England (Henry Tudor).

There are reports of the two princes being seen playing in the tower grounds shortly after Richard joined his brother, but there are no recorded sightings of either of them after the summer of 1483. An attempt to rescue them in late July failed. Their fate remains an enduring mystery.

Many historians believe the princes were murdered; some have suggested that the act may have happened towards the end of summer 1483. Maurice Keen argues that the rebellion against Richard in 1483 initially "aimed to rescue Edward V and his brother from the Tower before it was too late", but that, when the Duke of Buckingham became involved, it shifted to support of Henry Tudor because "Buckingham almost certainly knew that the princes in the Tower were dead." Alison Weir proposes 3 September 1483 as a potential date; however, Weir's work has been criticised for "arriving at a conclusion that depends more on her own imagination than on the uncertain evidence she has so misleadingly presented."

Clements Markham suggests the princes may have been alive as late as July 1484, pointing to the regulations issued by Richard III's household which stated: "the children should be together at one breakfast". James Gairdner, however, argues that it is unclear to whom the phrase "the children" alludes, and that it may not have been a reference to the princes. It may refer to Edward, Earl of Warwick (son of the Duke of Clarence) and Edward IV's two youngest daughters (Catherine and Bridget), all of whom were living under Richard's care at Sheriff Hutton.

Evidence

Other than their disappearance, there is no direct evidence that the princes were murdered, and "no reliable, well-informed, independent or impartial sources" for the associated events. Nevertheless, following their disappearance, rumours quickly spread that they had been murdered. Only one contemporary narrative account of the boys' time in the tower exists: that of Dominic Mancini. Mancini's account was not discovered until 1934, in the Municipal Library in Lille. Later accounts written after the accession of Henry Tudor are often claimed to be biased or influenced by Tudor propaganda.

Four unidentified bodies have been found which are considered possibly connected with the events of this period: two at the Tower of London and two in Saint George's Chapel, Windsor Castle. Those found in the tower were buried in Westminster Abbey, but authorities have refused to allow either set of remains to be subjected to DNA analysis to positively identify them as the remains of the princes.

Rumours
Several sources suggest there were rumours of the princes' deaths in the time following their disappearance. Rumours of murder also spread to France. In January 1484 Guillaume de Rochefort, Lord Chancellor of France, urged the Estates General to "take warning" from the fate of the princes, as their own king, Charles VIII, was only 13. The early reports, including that of Rochefort, Philippe de Commines (French politician), Caspar Weinreich (contemporary German chronicler) and Jan Allertz (Recorder of Rotterdam), all state that Richard killed the princes before he seized the throne (thus before June 1483). De Commines' Memoirs (c.1500), however, identifies the Duke of Buckingham as the person "who put them to death".

Only Mancini's account is contemporary, having been written in London before November 1483. The Croyland Chronicle and de Commines' account were written three and seventeen years later, respectively (and thus after Richard III's death and the accession of Henry VII). Markham, writing long before Mancini's account was discovered, argued that some accounts, including the Croyland Chronicle, might have been authored or heavily influenced by John Morton, Archbishop of Canterbury, in order to incriminate Richard III.

Early writers

Robert Fabyan's Chronicles of London, compiled around 30 years after the princes' disappearance, names Richard as murderer.

Thomas More (a Tudor loyalist who had grown up in the household of John Morton, an avowed foe of Richard III) wrote The History of King Richard III, c.1513. This identified Sir James Tyrrell as the murderer, acting on Richard's orders. Tyrrell was the loyal servant of Richard III who is said to have confessed to the murder of the princes before his execution for treason in 1502. In his history, More said that the princes were smothered to death in their beds by two agents of Tyrrell (Miles Forrest and John Dighton) and were then buried "at the stayre foote, metely depe in the grounde vnder a great heape of stones", but were later disinterred and buried in a secret place. Historian Tim Thornton claimed that the sons of Miles Forrest were at court in Henry VIII's England, and Thomas More's contacts with them could have given him the detail of the murder.

Polydore Vergil, in his Anglica Historia (c.1513), also specifies that Tyrrell was the murderer, stating that he "rode sorrowfully to London" and committed the deed with reluctance, upon Richard III's orders, and that Richard himself spread the rumours of the princes' death in the belief that it would discourage rebellion.

Holinshed's Chronicles, written in the second half of the 16th century, claims that the princes were murdered by Richard III. The chronicles were one of the main sources used by William Shakespeare for his play Richard III, which also portrays Richard as the murderer, in the sense that he commissions Tyrrell to have the boys killed. A. J. Pollard believes that the chronicle's account reflected the contemporary "standard and accepted account", but that by the time it was written "propaganda had been transformed into historical fact".

More wrote his account with the intention of writing about a moral point rather than a closely mirrored history. While More's account does rely on some firsthand sources, the account is generally taken from other sources. Additionally, More's account is one of the bases for Shakespeare's Richard III, which similarly indicts Richard for murdering the young princes.

Bodies

Tower of London 
On 17 July 1674, workmen remodelling the Tower of London dug up a wooden box containing two small human skeletons. The bones were found buried  under the staircase leading to the chapel of the White Tower. The remains were not the first children's skeletons found within the tower; the bones of two children had previously been found "in an old chamber that had been walled up", which Pollard suggests could equally well have been those of the princes. The reason the bones were attributed to the princes was because the location partially matched the account given by More. However, More further stated that they were later moved to a "better place", which disagrees with where the bones were discovered. The staircase that the bones were found underneath had not yet been built, at the time of Richard III. One anonymous report was that they were found with "pieces of rag and velvet about them"; the velvet could indicate that the bodies were those of aristocrats. Four years after their discovery, the bones were placed in an urn and, on the orders of King Charles II, interred in Westminster Abbey, in the wall of the Henry VII Lady Chapel. A monument designed by Christopher Wren marks the resting place of the putative princes. The inscription, written in Latin, states "Here lie interred the remains of Edward V, King of England, and Richard, Duke of York, whose long desired and much sought after bones, after over a hundred and ninety years, were found interred deep beneath the rubble of the stairs that led up to the Chapel of the White Tower, on the 17 of July in the Year of Our Lord 1674."

The bones were removed and examined in 1933 by the archivist of Westminster Abbey, Lawrence Tanner; a leading anatomist, Professor William Wright; and the president of the Dental Association, George Northcroft. By measuring certain bones and teeth, they concluded the bones belonged to two children around the correct ages for the princes. The bones were found to have been interred carelessly along with chicken and other animal bones. There were also three very rusty nails. One skeleton was larger than the other, but many of the bones were missing, including part of the smaller jawbone and all of the teeth from the larger one. Many of the bones had been broken by the original workmen. The examination has been criticised, on the grounds that it was conducted on the presumption that the bones were those of the princes and concentrated only on whether the bones showed evidence of suffocation; no attempt was even made to determine whether the bones were male or female.

No further scientific examination has since been conducted on the bones, which remain in Westminster Abbey, and DNA analysis (if DNA could be obtained) has not been attempted. A petition was started on the British government's "e-petition" website requesting that the bones be DNA tested, but was closed months before its expected close date. If it had received 100,000 signatories a parliamentary debate would have been triggered. Pollard points out that even if modern DNA and carbon dating proved the bones belonged to the princes, it would not prove who or what killed them.

St George's Chapel 
In 1789, workmen carrying out repairs in St. George's Chapel, Windsor, rediscovered and accidentally broke into the vault of Edward IV and Queen Elizabeth Woodville, discovering in the process what appeared to be a small adjoining vault. This vault was found to contain the coffins of two unidentified children. However, no inspection or examination was carried out and the tomb was resealed. The tomb was inscribed with the names of two of Edward IV's children: George, 1st Duke of Bedford who had died at the age of 2, and Mary of York who had died at the age of 14; both had predeceased the king.
However, two lead coffins clearly labelled as George Plantagenet and Mary Plantagenet were subsequently discovered elsewhere in the chapel (during the excavation for the royal tomb house for King George III under the Wolsey tomb-house in 1810–13), and were moved into the adjoining vault of Edward IV's, but at the time no effort was made to identify the two lead coffins already in Edward IV's vault.

In the late 1990s, work was being carried out near and around Edward IV's tomb in St George's Chapel; the floor area was excavated to replace an old boiler and also to add a new repository for the remains of future Deans and Canons of Windsor.  A request was forwarded to the Dean and Canons of Windsor to consider a possible examination of the two vaults either by fibre-optic camera or, if possible, a reexamination of the two unidentified lead coffins in the tomb also housing the lead coffins of two of Edward IV's children that were discovered during the building of the Royal Tomb for King George III (1810–13) and placed in the adjoining vault at that time.  Royal consent would be necessary to open any royal tomb, so it was felt best to leave the medieval mystery unsolved for at least the next few generations. The 2012 Leicester archaeological dig has prompted renewed interest in re-excavating the skeletons of the "two princes", but Queen Elizabeth II never granted the approval required for any such testing of an interred royal. In 2022, Tracy Borman, joint chief curator of Historic Royal Palaces, stated that King Charles III held "a very different view" on the subject and could potentially support an investigation.

Theories
 
The absence of hard evidence of what happened to the princes has led to a number of theories being put forward. The most common theory is that they were murdered close to the time that they disappeared, and among historians and authors who accept the murder theory, the most common explanation is that they were murdered by Richard.

Richard III
Many historians conclude that Richard III, the princes' uncle, is the likeliest culprit in the case of the disappearance of the princes for a number of reasons. Although the princes had been eliminated from the succession, Richard's hold on the monarchy was very insecure due to the way in which he had attained the crown, leading to a backlash against him by the Yorkist establishment. An attempt had already been made to rescue them and restore Edward to the throne, clear evidence that the existence of the princes would remain a threat as long as they were alive. The boys could have been used by Richard's enemies as figureheads for rebellion. Rumours of their death were in circulation by late 1483, but Richard never attempted to prove that they were alive by having them seen in public, which strongly suggests that they were dead by then. However, he did not remain silent on the matter. Raphael Holinshed, in his Chronicles of England, Scotland and Ireland, written in 1577, reports that Richard, "what with purging and declaring his innocence concerning the murder of his nephews towards the world, and what with cost to obtain the love and favour of the communal tie (which outwardlie glosed, and openly dissembled with him) ... gave prodigally so many and so great rewards, that now both he lacked, and scarce with honesty how to borrow." Richard also failed to open any investigation into the matter, which would have been in his interest if he was not responsible for the deaths of his nephews.

Richard was away from court on a progression through the Yorkist heartlands at the time the princes disappeared; if they died at this time, he would have been unable to murder them in person. They were under guard in the Tower of London, which was controlled by his men, and access to them was strictly limited by his instructions. He could therefore have dispatched one of his retainers to murder the princes on his behalf, but it is unlikely they could have been murdered without his knowledge. This is the version put forward by More and Polydore Vergil, who both name Sir James Tyrrell as the murderer. Tyrrell was an English knight who fought for the House of York on many occasions. Tyrrell was arrested by Henry VII's forces in 1502 for supporting another Yorkist claimant to the throne. Shortly before his execution, Tyrrell is said by More to have admitted, under torture, to having murdered the princes at the behest of Richard III. The only record of this is the writing of Thomas More, who wrote that, during his examination, Tyrrell made his confession as to the murders, saying that Richard III ordered their deaths. He also implicated two other men; despite further questioning, however, he was unable to say where the bodies were, claiming that Brackenbury had moved them. William Shakespeare portrays him as the culprit, sought out by Richard after Buckingham demurs. This version of events is accepted by Alison Weir and Hicks notes that his successful career and rapid promotion after 1483 'is consistent with his alleged murder of the princes'. However, the only record of Tyrrell's confession is through More, and "no actual confession has ever been found". Pollard casts doubts on the accuracy of More's accounts, suggesting it was "an elaboration of one of several circulating accounts"; however, he does not discount the possibility of it being "just his own invention", pointing to the "clear similarities to the stories of the Babes in the Wood". Clements Markham suggests that More's account was actually written by Archbishop Morton and that Tyrrell was induced to do the deed by Henry VII between 16 June and 16 July 1486, the dates of two general pardons that he received from the king.

Richard's guilt was widely accepted by contemporaries. George Cely, Dominic Mancini, John Rous, Fabyan's Chronicle, the Crowland Chronicler and the London Chronicle all noted the disappearance of the Princes, and all bar Mancini (who noted that he had no knowledge of what had happened) repeated rumours naming Richard as the murderer. Guillaume de Rochefort, Chancellor of France, named Richard as the murderer to the Estates General at Tours in January 1484. It also appears to have been the belief of Elizabeth Woodville, who would go on to support Henry Tudor in his campaign against Richard III. One possible motive for Elizabeth Woodville subsequently making her peace with Richard and bringing her daughters out of sanctuary could be that Richard had to swear a solemn oath, before witnesses, to protect and provide for her surviving children, which made it much less likely they could be quietly murdered as it was believed their brothers had been.

In line with this contemporary opinion many current historians, including David Starkey, Michael Hicks, Helen Castor and A. J. Pollard regard Richard himself as the most likely culprit. There was no formal accusation against Richard III on the matter; the Bill of Attainder brought by Henry VII made no definitive mention of the Princes in the Tower, but it did accuse Richard of "the unnatural, mischievous and great perjuries, treasons, homicides and murders, in shedding of infant's blood, with many other wrongs, odious offences and abominations against God and man". The "shedding of infant's blood" may be an accusation of the Princes' murder. Hicks speculated that it was a reference to speeches made in Parliament condemning the murder of the princes, which suggested that Richard's guilt had become common knowledge, or at least common wisdom.

Henry Stafford, 2nd Duke of Buckingham
The plausibility of Henry Stafford, 2nd Duke of Buckingham, Richard's right-hand man, as a suspect depends on the princes having already been dead by the time Stafford was executed in November 1483. It has been suggested that Buckingham had several potential motives. As a descendant of Edward III, through John of Gaunt, 1st Duke of Lancaster and Thomas of Woodstock, 1st Duke of Gloucester on his father's side, as well as through John of Gaunt, 1st Duke of Lancaster through John Beaufort, son of John of Gaunt on his mother's side, Buckingham may have hoped to accede to the throne himself in due course; alternatively, he may have been acting on behalf of a third party.

Some, notably Paul Murray Kendall, regard Buckingham as the likeliest suspect: his execution, after he had rebelled against Richard in October 1483, might signify that he and the king had fallen out; Weir takes this as a sign that Richard had murdered the princes without Buckingham's knowledge and Buckingham had been shocked by it. A contemporary Portuguese document suggests Buckingham as the guilty party, stating "...and after the passing away of king Edward in the year of 83, another one of his brothers, the Duke of Gloucester, had in his power the Prince of Wales and the Duke of York, the young sons of the said king and his brother, and turned them to the Duke of Buckingham, under whose custody the said Princes were starved to death." A document dated some decades after the disappearance was found within the archives of the College of Arms in London in 1980; this stated that the murder "be the vise of the Duke of Buckingham". This led Michael Bennett to suggest that possibly some of Richard's prominent supporters, Buckingham and James Tyrrell, murdered the princes on their own initiative without waiting for Richard's orders. Bennett noted in support of this theory: 'After the King's departure Buckingham was in effective command in the capital, and it is known that when the two men met a month later there was an unholy row between them.'

Buckingham is the only person to be named as responsible in a contemporary chronicle other than Richard himself. However, for two reasons he is unlikely to have acted alone. First of all, if he were guilty of acting without Richard's orders it is extremely surprising that Richard did not lay the blame for the princes' murder on Buckingham after Buckingham was disgraced and executed, especially as Richard could potentially have cleared his own name by doing so. Secondly, it is likely he would have required Richard's help to gain access to the princes, under close guard in the Tower of London, although Kendall argued as Constable of England, he might have been exempt from this ruling. As a result, although it is extremely possible that he was implicated in the decision to murder them, the hypothesis that he acted without Richard's knowledge is not widely accepted by historians. While Jeremy Potter suggested that Richard would have kept silent had Buckingham been guilty because nobody would have believed Richard was not party to the crime, he further notes that "Historians are agreed that Buckingham would never have dared to act without Richard's complicity, or at least, connivance". However, Potter also hypothesised that perhaps Buckingham was fantasising about seizing the crown himself at this point and saw the murder of the princes as a first step to achieving this goal. This theory formed the basis of Sharon Penman's historical novel, The Sunne in Splendour.

Henry VII
Henry VII (Henry Tudor), following his seizure of the crown, executed some of the rival claimants to the throne. John of Gloucester, illegitimate son of Richard III, is said by some sources to have been one of those executed. Henry was out of the country between the princes' disappearance and August 1485, thus his only opportunity to murder them would have been after his accession in 1485. Pollard suggests Henry (or those acting on his orders) is "the only plausible alternative to Richard III."

The year after becoming king, Henry married the princes' eldest sister, Elizabeth of York, to reinforce his claim to the throne. Not wanting the legitimacy of his wife or her claim as heir of Edward IV called into question, prior to the marriage he had repealed the Titulus Regius which had previously declared the princes (and Elizabeth) illegitimate. Markham suggests the princes were executed under Henry's orders between 16 June and 16 July 1486, claiming that it was only after this date that orders went out to circulate the story that Richard had killed the princes, and that the princes' mother, Elizabeth Woodville, knew that this story was false, and so Henry had to have her silenced. Markham suggests this was the motivation behind Henry's decision, in February 1487, to confiscate all of Elizabeth's lands and possessions, and have her confined to Bermondsey Abbey, "where she died six years afterwards". However, Arlene Okerlund suggests that her retirement to the abbey was her own decision, whilst Michael Bennett and Timothy Elston suggests the move was precautionary, precipitated by Lambert Simnel's claim to be her son Richard. Pollard calls Markham's theory "highly speculative", and states that Henry's silence over the princes was more likely "political calculation than personal guilt". Henry was also never accused of the murder by any contemporary, not even by his enemies, which he likely would have been had contemporaries thought there was any possibility of his guilt. Jeremy Potter, at the time he wrote Chairman of the Richard III Society, noted, 'With Henry, as with Richard, there is no real evidence and one must suspect that if he had killed the princes himself he would quickly have produced the corpses and some ingeniously appropriate story implicating Richard.' Further, Raphael Holinshed reported in 1577 that Richard "purged and declared his innocence" regarding "the murther of his nephews towards the world", indicating that the boys did indeed meet their end during Richard's days. It is also unlikely that the princes would have been kept alive in secret by Richard for two years after their last sighting while rumours of his responsibility for their murder circulated.

Other suspects
Some writers have also accused John Howard, 1st Duke of Norfolk; Margaret Beaufort, Henry VII's mother; and Jane Shore (Edward IV's mistress). Pollard writes of these theories: "None deserve serious consideration. The problem with all these accusations is that they beg the question of access to the Tower without Richard's knowledge and overlook the fact that Richard was responsible for the safekeeping of his nephews". The Beaufort theory has more recently been supported by Philippa Gregory in her BBC documentary series The Real White Queen and her Rivals, but is not supported by any evidence other than a speculative one of possible motive.

Other claims
Historian David Baldwin suggests that Henry VII's reticence on the subject may have been because at least one of the princes was still alive; he considers that Richard is more likely to survive, with Edward dying of a malady. Baldwin argues that it is "impossible" that no one knew what happened to the Princes after they entered the Tower; he believes Richard III and Henry VII, leading courtiers and their mother would all have known the boys' whereabouts and welfare. Baldwin argues that had this been the case, Henry VII would have had the choice of keeping quiet about the survival of Richard, or having him executed, and concluded, "He [Henry] would have been happy to let people think the boys had been murdered, but not to speculate when or by whose hand."

During the reign of Henry VII, two individuals claimed to be Richard, Duke of York, who had somehow escaped death. Lambert Simnel initially claimed to be Richard, before changing his story and claiming to be Edward Plantagenet, 17th Earl of Warwick. Perkin Warbeck later claimed to be Richard, appearing in Ireland and calling himself king Richard IV. Margaret of York, Duchess of Burgundy, formally recognised Warbeck as Richard. Margaret, Richard III's sister, an unrelenting opponent of Henry VII, had previously recognised Simnel as Warwick. Warbeck was also accepted as Richard by James IV of Scotland. After a failed attempt to invade England he was captured. He retracted his claims, was imprisoned and later executed. Many modern historians believe he was an imposter, whose supporters accepted his claim for political reasons.

The fact that two persons claimed to be Richard led the 18th-century writer Horace Walpole to argue that Richard had in fact escaped death, and that Warbeck genuinely was Richard, a view also supported by the Scottish historian Malcolm Laing. Walpole, however, later retracted his views and stated that he now believed the princes to have been murdered by Richard III to secure his hold on the crown. In more recent times the theory that Warbeck was Richard has been endorsed by Annette Carson, a freelance writer with a "lifelong interest" in Richard III. She suggested that Richard smuggled the princes abroad to the custody of their aunt, the Duchess of Burgundy, and they were raised there under false identities. Baldwin's theory was that by having removed them from sight to prevent them being a focus for opposition, he was then unable to bring them back to court to scotch rumours of their murder without once again having them become a threat.

In 2021, researchers from the "Missing Princes Project" claimed to have found evidence that Edward had lived out his days in the rural Devon village of Coldridge. They have linked the 13-year-old prince with a man named John Evans, who arrived in the village around 1484, and was immediately given an official position and the title of Lord of the Manor. Researcher John Dike noted Yorkist symbols and stained glass windows depicting Edward V in a Coldridge chapel commissioned by Evans and built around 1511, unusual for the location.

Impact
The political reality of the disappearance of the princes, whatever happened to them, is that they were believed to have been murdered and Richard was blamed for their murders. Even if he had not been directly responsible for their deaths, the fact that he had deposed them and kept them under tight guard made him responsible for their welfare in the eyes of contemporaries, and the belief that they had been murdered made him guilty. As Baldwin noted in support of his conclusion that Richard would not have murdered the princes, "It seems incredible Richard ever supposed killing his nephews would help secure his position or make him more acceptable to his subjects." An initial uprising in September 1483, aimed at deposing Richard and restoring Edward V to the throne, was not stopped by rumours of Edward's murder. Instead, the rebels rallied around Henry Tudor as a potential alternative candidate; Horrox says Tudor was "an inconceivable choice if Edward V and his brother were thought to be still available." Anthony Cheetham, who considered Richard likely to have had the princes murdered, commented that it was "a colossal blunder. Nothing else could have prompted the deflated Woodvilles to hitch themselves to Henry Tudor's bandwagon." The fact that the majority of the rebels were wealthy and powerful southern noblemen, loyal to Edward IV, suggests a degree of revulsion against Richard's usurpation of the throne: their willingness to fight on under an implausible alternative candidate suggests that they regarded anyone as preferable to Richard as King due to his usurpation and the murder of his nephews. Bennett suggested that perhaps those who had initially supported Richard in his seizure of power may have felt complicit in the crime, which he thought "might explain the bitterness of the subsequent recriminations against him." Hicks speculated that these men may have been "appalled by the character of the regime...shocked by Richard's crimes." Their defection severely weakened Richard, who had to impose his supporters among the northern lords as officeholders in the southern counties to maintain order, in itself a very unpopular act that further damaged his reputation. In Pollard's words, "the belief that he had murdered his nephews seriously handicapped Richard's efforts to secure himself on the throne he had usurped."

In popular culture
The mystery of the Princes in the Tower has spawned best-selling novels such as Josephine Tey's The Daughter of Time and four novels in Philippa Gregory's Cousins' War series, and continues to attract the attention of historians and novelists.

Literature

Fiction
C. Lysah – The Little Princes in the Tower (1892)
Elaine M. Alphin – Tournament of Time (1994)
Sonya Hartnett - Princes (1997)
Valerie Anand – Crown of Roses (1989)
Margaret Campbell Barnes – The Tudor Rose  (1953)
Emma Darwin – A Secret Alchemy (2009)
John M. Ford - The Dragon Waiting:  A Masque of History (1983) 
Elizabeth George – "I, Richard" (short story) (2002)
Philippa Gregory
The White Queen (2009)
The Red Queen (2010)
The Kingmaker's Daughter (2012)
 The White Princess (2013)
Margaret Peterson Haddix
Found (2008)
Sent (2009)
Rosemary Hawley Jarman – "We Speak No Treason" (1971)
Sharon Kay Penman – The Sunne in Splendour (1982)
Elizabeth Peters – The Murders of Richard III (1974)
Anne Easter Smith
A Rose for the Crown (2008)
The Daughter of York (2008)
The King's Grace (2009)
Royal Mistress  (2013)
Jason Charles – The Claws of Time (2017)
William Shakespeare – Richard III (circa 1595)
Josephine Tey – The Daughter of Time (1951)
George R. R. Martin - A Clash of Kings (1998), where the bodies of two young boys, thought to be princes, are found hanged and burned. Martin's Game of Thrones is inspired in part by the Wars of the Roses.
Jodi Taylor - Plan for the Worst (2020)

Non-fiction
Horace Walpole – Historic Doubts on the Life and Reign of Richard III (1768)

Audrey Williamson – The Mystery of the Princes (1978)
Giles St. Aubyn – The Year of Three Kings, 1483 (Atheneum, 1983)
A. J. Pollard – Richard III and the Princes in the Tower (1991)
Alison Weir – The Princes in the Tower (1992)
Bert Fields – Royal Blood: Richard III and the mystery of the princes (HarperCollins, 1998)
Josephine Wilkinson – The Princes in the Tower (2013)
John Ashdown-Hill - The Mythology of the "Princes in the Tower" (2018)
Nathen Amin - Henry VII and the Tudor Pretenders; Simnel, Warbeck and Warwick (2020)

Television
 The first series of the British sitcom Blackadder is set in a comic alternative history where the Princes in the Tower survived and grew to adulthood, Prince Richard assuming the throne as Richard IV upon Richard III's death at Bosworth Field. Edward V is ignored by the storyline, and is never mentioned in script.
An episode of the Canadian children's documentary series Mystery Hunters is dedicated to the unsolved case of the missing princes.
In 1984, Channel 4 broadcast a four-hour "trial" of Richard III on the charge of murdering the princes. The presiding judge was Lord Elwyn-Jones and the barristers were recruited from the Queen's Counsel, but had to remain anonymous. Expert witnesses included David Starkey. The jury was composed of ordinary citizens. The burden of proof was left to the prosecution. The jury found in favour of the defendant.
In 2005 Channel 4 and RDF Media produced a drama entitled Princes in the Tower about the interrogation of Perkin Warbeck, in which Warbeck almost convinces Henry VII that he really is Richard, Duke of York. Warbeck "remembers" that Henry's mother Margaret Beaufort poisoned his brother Edward V, after which Richard III spirited him away to safety. Warbeck succeeds in alienating king Henry from his mother and wife, who now believes Warbeck to be her lost brother. Margaret then shows Warbeck two young men in chains, whom she presents as the real princes, locked up for years in isolation and now completely insane. She forces Warbeck to confess that he is an imposter, and he is hanged. In the final scene Margaret is seen overseeing the burial of a piece of regal clothing with two skeletons, while Thomas More's secret account of the events is revealed as the source of the whole story.
The 2013 BBC One 10-part TV series The White Queen is an adaptation of Philippa Gregory's novels The White Queen (2009), The Red Queen (2010) and The Kingmaker's Daughter (2012). And Secrets of Great British Castles (2015) which explores all of London's royalty.
The 2017 Starz miniseries The White Princess is an adaptation of Philippa Gregory's novel of the same name which speculates on the fate of Prince Richard.

See also
List of people who disappeared
List of unsolved deaths

References

Further reading
 Thornton, Tim. "More on a Murder: The Deaths of the 'Princes in the Tower', and Historiographical Implications for the Regimes of Henry VII and Henry VIII." History 106.369 (2021): 4-25. online

1480s missing person cases
Disappeared princes
Edward V of England
Missing English children
Richard III of England
Sibling duos
Unsolved deaths in England